Dustabad-e Bala (also Romanized as Dūstābād-e Bālā; also known as Dūstābād) is a village in Shaskuh Rural District, Central District, Zirkuh County, South Khorasan Province, Iran. At the 2006 census, its population was 95, in 30 families.

References 

Populated places in Zirkuh County